Alin Nicușor Popa (born 1 January 1991) is a Romanian professional footballer who plays as a midfielder or forward for Real Bradu. Born in Caracal but grew up in Pitești, at Argeș Pitești academy, Popa played all his career for the two main teams of Argeș County, Argeș Pitești and Mioveni having played more than 100 matches for the white-violet eagles and more than 80 for the yellow and greens. His father, Vasile Popa was also a footballer.

References

External links
 
 

1991 births
Living people
People from Caracal, Romania
Romanian footballers
Association football midfielders
Association football forwards
Romania youth international footballers
Liga I players
Liga II players
Liga III players
FC Argeș Pitești players
CS Mioveni players